Gilmer County is a county located in the north central portion of the U.S. state of Georgia. As of the 2020 census, the population was 31,353. The county seat is Ellijay. It was based on a historic Cherokee town also spelled as Elejoy in the eighteenth century. The county was created on December 3, 1832 and was named for George Rockingham Gilmer, a politician who served two non-consecutive terms as governor of the state. Gilmer County is home of the annual Apple Festival, which is held in mid-October. Ninety percent of the land is in cropland and forest. Poultry raising and processing makes up the largest portion of the agricultural economy, which generates 33.2% of the total revenues. Manufacturing is about 20%.

History
This was long inhabited by cultures of indigenous peoples. It was part of the homeland of the Cherokee. They had a village, Elatseyi, meaning "new ground". Other sources say it means "green place". It was sometimes spelled "Elejoy" on 18th century colonial maps. It was located at the confluence of the Ellijay and Cartecay rivers, which create the Coosawattee River. The later European-American town of Ellijay developed at this site.

In 1832, Gilmer County was organized as Georgia started to encroach on Cherokee territory. Ellijay was designated as the county seat in 1834.

On 12 January 1854, parts of Gilmer County as well as parts of neighboring Union County were taken to form the newly created Fannin County, Georgia.

This is still a primarily rural county, with agriculture and forests supporting the economy. It also has a growing tourist sector, some based on whitewater kayaking and canoeing on the rivers in the area.

Economy
Farming is still important, although, by 2002, the amount of land in the county devoted to agriculture had declined to 24.7 thousand acres. Most farms are sized at 10-49 acres, or 50-179 acres. Poultry raising and processing make up the largest portion of the agricultural economy. Agriculture and directly related businesses, such as landscape services, generate $565.1 million, or 33.2% of the county's economic output. Manufacturing generates $351.4 million, or 20.6%.

Geography

The county is located in the Blue Ridge Mountains.

The vast majority of Gilmer County is located in the Coosawattee River sub-basin in the ACT River Basin (Coosa-Tallapoosa River Basin). Three very small parts of the eastern and northern edges of the county are located in the Conasauga River sub-basin of the ACT River Basin, while slightly larger portions of the northern and eastern border areas of Gilmer County are located in the Ocoee River sub-basin of the Middle Tennessee-Hiwassee basin.

Adjacent counties
 Fannin County (north)
 Dawson County (southeast)
 Pickens County (south)
 Gordon County (southwest)
 Murray County (west)

National protected area
 Chattahoochee National Forest (part)

Transportation

Major highways

  U.S. Route 76
  State Route 2
  State Route 5
  State Route 52
  State Route 136
  State Route 282
  State Route 382
  State Route 515

Secondary highways

 Old S.R. 5
 Yukon Road
 Burnt Mountain Road (Old S.R. 108)
 Boardtown Road
 Big Creek Road
 Doublehead Gap Road
 Whitestone Road
 Conasauga Road

Demographics

2000 census
As of the census of 2000, there were 23,456 people, 9,071 households, and 6,694 families living in the county.  Estimates now put the population closer to 40,000 people.  The population density was 55 people per square mile (21/km2).  There were 11,924 housing units at an average density of 28 per square mile (11/km2).  The racial makeup of the county was 93.63% White, 0.27% Black or African American, 0.46% Native American, 0.23% Asian, 0.26% Pacific Islander, 3.76% from other races, and 1.39% from two or more races.  7.74% of the population were Hispanic or Latino of any race.

There were 9,071 households, out of which 30.90% had children under the age of 18 living with them, 61.10% were married couples living together, 8.40% had a female householder with no husband present, and 26.20% were non-families. 22.20% of all households were made up of individuals, and 8.60% had someone living alone who was 65 years of age or older.  The average household size was 2.57 and the average family size was 2.96.

In the county, the population was spread out, with 24.30% under the age of 18, 8.50% from 18 to 24, 28.50% from 25 to 44, 25.60% from 45 to 64, and 13.10% who were 65 years of age or older.  The median age was 37 years. For every 100 females there were 103.00 males.  For every 100 females age 18 and over, there were 101.30 males.

The median income for a household in the county was $34,330, and the median income for a family was $41,805. Males had a median income of $31,217 versus $24,020 for females. The per capita income for the county was $18,117.  About 17.8% of families and 23.0% of the population were below the poverty line, including 29.6% of those under age 18 and 10.6% of those age 65 or over.

2010 census
As of the 2010 United States Census, there were 28,292 people, 11,314 households, and 8,000 families living in the county. The racial makeup of the county was 92.3% white, 0.5% black or African American, 0.3% Asian, 0.3% American Indian, 0.1% Pacific islander, 5.2% from other races, and 1.3% from two or more races. Those of Hispanic or Latino origin, of any race, made up 9.5% of the population. In terms of ancestry, non-Hispanic people identified as 18.7% being Irish, 17.3% American, 16.3% of English ancestry, and 13.4% were German.

Of the 11,314 households, 29.2% had children under the age of 18 living with them, 57.2% were married couples living together, 8.9% had a female householder with no husband present, 29.3% were non-families, and 24.5% of all households were made up of individuals. The average household size was 2.48 and the average family size was 2.92. The median age was 43.4 years.

The median income for a household in the county was $36,741 and the median income for a family was $45,317. Males had a median income of $32,177 versus $27,288 for females. The per capita income for the county was $20,439. About 12.4% of families and 18.1% of the population were below the poverty line, including 24.1% of those under age 18 and 8.0% of those age 65 or over.

2020 census

As of the 2020 United States Census, there were 31,353 people, 12,021 households, and 8,028 families residing in the county.

Government and politics
Gilmer County is governed by a three-member Board of Commissioners. The current board Chairman is Charlie Paris. The Post 1 Commissioner is Hubert Parker and the Post 2 Commissioner is Karleen Ferguson . Other current government officials include: Sheriff, Stacy Nicholson; Probate Judge, Scott Chastain; Magistrate Judge, Kevin Johnson; Clerk of Court, Amy Johnson; Tax Commissioner, Rebecca Marshall; Coroner, Jerry Hensley. All are members of the Republican Party.

Some of the past Chairmen of the Board of Commissioners include J.C. Sanford (2011-2014), Mark Chastain (2009–2010), Jerry Farist (2005–2008), and Rayburn Smith (1997–2004). Merle Howell served as the first chairman of the three-member board starting on January 1, 1996. She was recalled by the voters of Gilmer County, who elected Rayburn Smith in July 1997.

Up until 1988, Gilmer County was governed by a sole commissioner. Cicero Logan served as commissioner from 1946 until 1959. Harold Hefner was elected in 1958 and served from 1959 until 1972. Gilmer County's last sole commissioner was Benjamin N. Whitaker who served from 1973 until 1988.

In 1988, Gilmer County changed to a five-member board of commissioners who then hired a “county manager” to run day-to-day operations of the county. The first five-member board included Mack Logan, Ruel Reece, Garvin Davis Jr., John Penland, and Charles Aaron. Jim Bailey served as county manager.

Politics
The voters of Gilmer, like neighboring Rabun, Towns, Pickens and Fannin counties, were different in their historic partisan preferences from other parts of Georgia. Since the post-Civil War period, it had a competitive Republican party. At the turn of the 20th century, the disfranchisement of most blacks in Georgia resulted in the state's white conservatives voting mostly for Democratic candidates at the state and national level. In contrast, these northern Georgia counties voted for Republican presidential candidates in several early 20th-century elections.

Attractions
Gilmer County is home to an impressive specimen of yellow poplar known colloquially as "the big poplar". This particular specimen is 100 feet tall and approximately 20 feet in circumference at its base. The tree can be accessed via Bear Creek Trail in the Chattahoochee National Forest.

Communities

Cities
 Ellijay
 East Ellijay

Census-designated place
 Cherry Log

Unincorporated communities
 Ai
 Tails Creek
 Whitepath
 Yukon

In popular culture
James Dickey's novel Deliverance was set on a fictional river modeled on the Coosawattee, prior to the construction of the dam producing Carters Lake. It was adapted as a 1972 thriller movie of the same name. It was filmed further north in the state, in Rabun County.

See also

 National Register of Historic Places listings in Gilmer County, Georgia
List of counties in Georgia

References

External links

 http://www.gilmercounty-ga.gov/

 
Georgia (U.S. state) counties
1832 establishments in Georgia (U.S. state)
Populated places established in 1832
Northeast Georgia
Counties of Appalachia